Unfuccwitable (stylized in all caps) is the seventh mixtape by American rapper Asian Doll, released under her "Asian Da Brat" moniker. It serves as the only mixtape released under the Asian Da Brat name. It was released on May 3, 2019 by 1017 Eskimo / Alamo Records. The mixtape features guest verses from Smooky MarGielaa, Stunna 4 Vegas, Calboy, PnB Meen, Yung Mal, Smokepurpp and Lil Durk.

Singles
"Grandson," with a video starring King Von, was released as a promotional single on December 17, 2018.

"Draco" featuring Smokepurpp was released as the mixtape's lead single on April 24, 2019.

"Tweakin" was released as the mixtape's second single on May 1, 2019.

Track listing
Credits adapted from Qobuz.

References

2019 mixtape albums
Asian Da Brat albums